Josephine Louis (born 1930) is an American billionaire heiress, the widow of John J. Louis, Jr., who served as the United States Ambassador to the United Kingdom.

In 1953, Josephine Peters married John J. Louis, Jr.

As of August 2015, she had a net worth of $2.7 billion.

Personal life
She and John J. Louis, Jr had three children:
John Jeffry Louis III, who sits on the S. C. Johnson & Son board of directors.
Kimberly Stewart
Tracy Merrill

References

1930 births
American billionaires
Female billionaires
Samuel Curtis Johnson family
Living people